The University of Sudbury is a bilingual and tri-cultural university in Sudbury, Ontario, Canada. It provides undergraduate programming in both French and English in Religious Studies, Philosophy, Indigenous Studies, and in French in Journalism and Folklore. It was a federated school of Laurentian University until May 1, 2021, when Laurentian terminated its relationships with all of its federated schools as part of the 2021 Laurentian University financial crisis; it was subsequently announced that the University of Sudbury will continue operations as an independent French-language university.

The university is a member of Association des collèges et universités de la francophonie canadienne (Association of Colleges and Universities of the Canadian Francophonie), a network of academic institutions of the Canadian Francophonie.

Founded as a Roman Catholic institution, the university became officially secular in 2021.

History
The university was founded as the Collège du Sacré-Cœur  (Sacred Heart College) in 1913 by the Jesuits. Exclusively French from 1916, Sacred Heart College was the centre of education for young Franco-Ontarians for decades since it was the first, and for a long time, the only institution of higher learning in Northern Ontario. In 1957, it changed its name and became the University of Sudbury. In 1959, it became a bilingual university. In 1960, it formed the Catholic component of Laurentian federation.

A plaque was erected by the Ontario Heritage Trust, an agency of the Ministry of Heritage, Sport, Tourism and Culture Industries, at Notre Dame & Kathleen Streets, Sudbury:

In 2017, the Ontario Heritage Trust also erected a permanent plaque at the current University of Sudbury location, to commemorate the creation and first raising of the Franco-Ontarian flag:The Franco-Ontarian Flag

The Franco-Ontarian Flag was first raised at the University of Sudbury on September 25, 1975, at a time when Sudbury was experiencing unprecedented growth in Franco-Ontarian arts and culture. Conceived by Gaétan Gervais, historian at Laurentian University, and student Michel Dupuis, the first flag was made by Jacline England, a student and staff member at the university. Refusing to take sole credit for the flag, its creators hoped that the Franco-Ontarian community would claim it as their own and a committee was formed to promote it. The flag was adopted as a unifying symbol during times of struggle and resistance, such as the Penetanguishene school crisis of 1979 and the SOS Montfort campaign in Ottawa in 1997. In 2001, the Ontario Legislature officially recognized the flag as the emblem of the Ontario French-speaking community. Since 2010, Franco-Ontarian Day has been celebrated annually on September 25. Today, the green and white flag with the French lily and the Ontario trillium endures as the most prominent symbol of the province’s diverse francophone community and represents more than 400 years of the French presence in Ontario.

References

External links

 University of Sudbury
 Laurentian University
 Contact North
 Association of Universities and Colleges of Canada profile

Laurentian University
French-language universities and colleges in Ontario
Universities in Ontario
Former universities and colleges of Jesuits